Lutheran Medical Center may refer to:

Lutheran Medical Center (Colorado), in Wheat Ridge, Colorado
Gundersen Lutheran Medical Center, in La Crosse, Wisconsin
NYU Lutheran Medical Center, in Brooklyn, New York City

See also
Lutheran Hospital (disambiguation)